Siyabonga is a South African given name/term meaning "Thanks or Thank you". Notable people with the name include:
Siyabonga Booi (born 1986), South African cricketer 
Siyabonga Cwele (born 1957), South African politician 
Siyabonga Mdluli (born 1986), Swaziland football player
Siyabonga Mpontshane (born 1986), South African football goalkeeper 
Siyabonga Nhlapo (born 1988), South African football midfielder 
Siyabonga Nkosi (born 1981), South African football player
Siyabonga Nomvethe (born 1977), South African football striker 
Siyabonga Nontshinga (born 1987), South African football striker 
Scarra Ntubeni (born Siyabonga Ntubeni in 1991), South African rugby union footballer
Siyabonga Sangweni (born 1981), South African football defender 
Siyabonga Shibe (born 1978), South African actor
Siyabonga Siphika (born 1981), South African football midfielder